Elijah of Ferrara (Hebrew: אליהו מפררה, or אליהו מפרארה) was a Jewish-Italian Talmudist and traveler of the earlier part of the 15th century. He was engaged in 1437 as lecturer and teacher in Jerusalem, where he arrived after a stormy voyage, during which he lost his son and grandson. He wrote several letters to his wife and children, whom he had left behind in Ferrara; only one of these epistles, dated 1438, has been preserved. This "Iggeret," written in rimed prose, has been published in the collection "Dibre Ḥakamim," Metz, 1853, and translated by Carmoly ("Itinéeraires," pp. 331–337) under the title "Ahabat Ẓiyyon." In this he gives a description of Jerusalem, recounts the legends current about the "children of Israel," the Ten Tribes, and the Sambation River, and states his intention to visit other parts of Palestine and to send a description of what he sees there. A fragment of another letter has survived, published by Isaac Akrish in his "Ḳol Mebasser" (Constantinople, 1577). From remarks contained in the latter in reference to medical practise in Jerusalem it may be inferred that Elijah was also a physician. Elijah's depictions are also included in Judah David Eisenstein's collection "Otsar Masa'ot" (1927).

Bibliography
Steinschneider, Cat. Bodl. col. 929; 
Luncz, Jerusalem, iii. 48;
Munk, Palestine, p. 643;
Carmoly, Itinéraires, pp. 329–337;
Grätz, Gesch. 2d ed., viii. 277.

External links
Elijah of Ferrara, 1434 Letter, Elkan Nathan Adler, Jewish Travellers

15th-century Italian writers
15th-century Italian rabbis
Explorers of Asia
Holy Land travellers
Physicians from Ferrara
Medieval Jewish travel writers
Pilgrimage accounts
15th-century Sephardi Jews
Talmudists
Italian explorers
15th-century rabbis in Jerusalem
Religious leaders from Ferrara
Writers from Ferrara
15th-century travelers